Teo González (born August 7, 1964 in Quinto, Spain) is a Spanish postminimalist painter.

Life and work
González was born in Quinto and reared in Zaragoza, Spain. During his youth he won numerous distinctions in drawing awarded by the Spanish government. In 1991 he moved to California, where he attended California State University of Bakersfield. He graduated magna cum laude in 1997, receiving a bachelor's degree in fine art.

Teo González's first solo show was with Brian Gross Fine Art in San Francisco, CA in 1996. Currently he works and lives in Brooklyn, NY. Known for his work using drops of pigment and grids, González's work is frequently compared to that of Agnes Martin, Jackson Pollock and Sol LeWitt.

Museums and Public Collections 
The Museum of Modern Art, N.Y., Los Angeles County Museum of Art, C.A., National Gallery of Art, Washington D.C., Museo Pablo Serrano, Zaragoza, Spain, Ayuntamiento de Miego, Santander, Spain, Corcoran Gallery of Art, Washington D.C., Hood Museum of Art, Dartmouth College, N.H., San Diego Museum of Art, C.A., New Mexico Museum of Art, Santa Fe N.M., Museo de Dibujo Julio Gavin-Castillo de Larrés, Spain, Fifth Floor Foundation, N.Y., The Judith Rothschild Foundation, N.Y., Achenbach Foundation Fine Arts Museums of San Francisco, C.A., The Progressive Art Collection O.H., Borusan Contemporary Art Collection, Istanbul, Turkey, Circa XX, Madrid Spain

References
 Teo González on Artnet
 Brian Gross Fine Art
 Art ltd. Magazine May 2013
 New Beginnings, The Albuquerque Journal October 2010
 Artnews, December 2010
 Artnews, January 2007
 Artforum, December 2006 
 Artnews August 2005

20th-century Spanish painters
20th-century Spanish male artists
Spanish male painters
21st-century Spanish painters
1964 births
Living people
21st-century Spanish male artists